Kin is an original soundtrack album by Scottish post-rock band Mogwai, released on 31 August 2018 on Rock Action Records in the UK and Europe, and Temporary Residence Limited in the United States. Two tracks "Donuts" and "We're Not Done (End Title)" were released ahead of the album.

The music was composed for Kin, the 2018 American science fiction action film directed by Jonathan and Josh Baker and written by Daniel Casey. Mogwai have previously scored documentaries, but this is their first full film soundtrack. Guitarist Stuart Braithwaite said "It was amazing to do a project that was so different to anything we’ve done before and see how our music fits in a totally different environment to how it’s been used before."

Track listing

Personnel
Mogwai
 Stuart Braithwaite – guitar, vocals, performer 
 Dominic Aitchison – bass guitar, performer 
 Barry Burns – guitar, piano, synthesizer, performer 
 Martin Bulloch - Drums, performer 
 Chris Mollere - music supervisor 
 Kevin Banks - music editor
 Richard Henderson - music editor

Charts

References

Mogwai soundtracks
2018 soundtrack albums
Rock Action Records albums
Temporary Residence Limited albums